Studley may refer to:

Places

Australia
 Studley Park, Yarra Bend Park, Melbourne
 Studley Park, Narellan, New South Wales

England
 Studley, Oxfordshire
 Studley Priory, Oxfordshire
 Studley, Warwickshire
 Studley Priory, Warwickshire
 Studley, Wiltshire
 Studley Green, Buckinghamshire
 Studley Green, Wiltshire
 Studley Royal Park, North Yorkshire
 Lower Studley, Wiltshire
 Upper Studley, Wiltshire

United States
 Studley, Kansas
 Studley, Virginia
 Studleys Pond, Rockland, Massachusetts

Organisations
 Studley College, former college in Warwickshire
 Studley F.C., football club in Warwickshire
 Studley High School, a secondary school in Warwickshire
 Savills Studley, international commercial real estate firm

People
 Studley (surname), a surname and list of people with the name